John S. Biersdorf (October 11, 1925 – June 1, 2009) was an American politician.

Biersdorf was born on a farm in Deerfield Township, Steele County, Minnesota, near Owatonna, Minnesota and graduated from Owatonna Senior High School. He served in the United States Army during World War II. Biersdorf graduated from University of Minnesota with a degree in business. He was a farmer and involved with the insurance business. Biersdorf lived in Owatonna, Minnesota, with his wife and family, He served on the Owatonna School Board and on the Steele County Conservation Soil Board. Biersdorf also served in the Minnesota House of Representatives from 1971 to 1980 and was a Republican. He died at a health care facility in Golden Valley, Minnesota.

References

1925 births
2009 deaths
People from Owatonna, Minnesota
Businesspeople from Minnesota
Farmers from Minnesota
Military personnel from Minnesota
University of Minnesota alumni
School board members in Minnesota
Republican Party members of the Minnesota House of Representatives